Varaždin County was an administrative subdivision (županija) of the Kingdom of Croatia-Slavonia. Croatia-Slavonia was an autonomous kingdom within the Lands of the Crown of Saint Stephen (Transleithania), the Hungarian part of the dual Austro-Hungarian Empire. Its territory is now in northern Croatia. The capital of the county was Varaždin (Croatian, in Hungarian: Varasd).

Geography
Varaždin County shared borders with the Austrian land Styria, the Hungarian county of Zala, and the Croatian-Slavonian county of Bjelovar-Križevci and Zagreb. The river Drava formed its northern border. Its area was 2521 km² around 1910.

History
The territory of Varaždin County was part of the Kingdom of Croatia when it entered a personal union with the Kingdom of Hungary in 1102, and with it became part of the Habsburg monarchy in 1526. It was part of the Varaždin Generalate of the Military Frontier. After 1607, the position of the county's župan was hereditary, given to the Erdődy noble family.

In 1920, by the Treaty of Trianon the county became part of the newly formed Kingdom of Serbs, Croats and Slovenes (later renamed to Yugoslavia). Since 1991, when Croatia became independent from Yugoslavia, the county is part of the Republic of Croatia.

Demographics
In 1900, the county had a population of 279,448 people and was composed of the following linguistic communities:

Total:

 Croatian: 270,897 (96.9%)
 Serbian: 2,464 (0.9%)
 German: 1,654 (0.6%)
 Hungarian: 1,061 (0.4%)
 Slovak: 126 (0.0%)
 Ruthenian: 4 (0.0%)
 Romanian: 1 (0.0%)
 Other or unknown: 3,241 (1.2%)

According to the census of 1900, the county was composed of the following religious communities:

Total:

 Roman Catholic: 275,111 (98.5%)
 Serbian Orthodox: 2,502 (0.9%)
 Jewish: 1,612 (0.6%)
 Lutheran: 161 (0.0%)
 Calvinist: 31 (0.0%)
 Greek Catholic: 26 (0.0%)
 Unitarian: 0 (0.0%)
 Other or unknown: 5 (0.0%)

In 1910, the county had a population of 307,010 people and was composed of the following linguistic communities:

Total:

 Croatian: 300,033 (97.7%) 
 Serbian: 2,384 (0.8%)
 German: 1,172 (0.4%)
 Hungarian: 1,095 (0.4%) 
 Slovak: 41 (0.0%)
 Ruthenian: 0 (0.0%)
 Romanian: 2 (0.0%)
 Other or unknown: 2,283 (0.7%)

According to the census of 1910, the county was composed of the following religious communities:

Total:

 Roman Catholic: 303,038 (98.7%)
 Serbian Orthodox: 2,409 (0.8%)
 Jewish: 1,341 (0.4%)
 Lutheran: 114 (0.0%)
 Calvinist: 42 (0.0%)
 Greek Catholic: 61 (0.0%)
 Unitarian: 0 (0.0%)
 Other or unknown: 5 (0.0%)

Subdivisions
In the early 20th century, the subdivisions of Varasd county were:

See also

Current Varaždin County

Notes

 
1920 disestablishments
Former counties of Croatia
Counties in the Kingdom of Hungary
States and territories established in the 12th century